El Boldal Airport  is an airport serving Santa Cruz, a city in the O'Higgins Region of Chile.

See also

Transport in Chile
List of airports in Chile

References

External links
OpenStreetMap - Kaduna
Bing Maps - El Boldal

Airports in Chile
Airports in O'Higgins Region